Niall Curran (born 1980) is an Irish Gaelic footballer who played as a full-back for the Tipperary senior team.

Born in Mullinahone, County Tipperary, Curran first played competitive Gaelic games during his schooling at Scoil Ruáin. He arrived on the inter-county scene at the age of sixteen when he first linked up with the Tipperary minor team before later joining the under-21 side. He joined the senior panel during the 2004 championship. Curran later became a regular member of the starting fifteen and won one Tommy Murphy Cup medal.

Curran was a member of the Munster inter-provincial team on a number of occasions. At club level he is a one-time championship medallist as a hurler with Mullinahone.

His brothers, Paul and Seán, have also represented Tipperary in hurling.

He retired from inter-county football following the conclusion of the 2011 championship.

In retirement from playing Curran became involved in team management and coaching, most notably as a selector with the Tipperary under-21 hurling team.

Honours

Player

Mullinahone
Tipperary Senior Hurling Championship (1): 2002

Tipperary
Tommy Murphy Cup (1): 2005

References

1980 births
Living people
Mullinahone Gaelic footballers
Mullinahone hurlers
Tipperary inter-county Gaelic footballers
Munster inter-provincial Gaelic footballers
Hurling selectors